Kernodle is a surname. Notable people with the surname include:

Don Kernodle (1950–2021), American professional wrestler
Jeremy Kernodle (born 1976), American judge
Tammy L. Kernodle, American musicologist